Swami Bhuteshananda was born on 8 September 1901 at Somsar (an interior village) in Bengal Presidency. His premonastic name was Vijay Chandra. His father was Purna Chandra Roy and his mother Charubala Devi. In his student life, he met Jnan Maharaj (a direct disciple of Swami Vivekananda). Under influence of his and some other spiritual young boys, he started to go to Belur Math frequently and he met many of the direct disciples of Sri Ramakrishna. He graduated from Government Sanskrit College (Kolkata, then Calcutta) where he mastered Bengali, English and Sanskrit. Due to his visits to the Math, one day he went to the Math to become Monk (Sannyasi), but as his studies was not completed, he was asked to come later. This made him leave his residence and he built a Shiva temple in Baghbazar (Calcutta) and lived there like a renunciate monk, practicing intense Tapasya. He was present during the funeral of Sri Sarada Devi, in December 1920.

In 1921 Saradananda (direct disciple of Sri Ramakrishna) initiated Vijay with Mantradiksha at the Mother's house. He was bestowed with the vows of Brahmacharya by Shivananda in 1923 on Holy mother's birthday, and was named 'Priya Chaitanya'. He took  Sannyasa from Swami Shivananda (another direct disciple of Sri Ramamkrishna). Swami Gambhirananda was also initiated into Brahmacharya in 1923 and into Sannyasa in 1928 by Swami Shivananda. After he became a monk, he went to Uttarkashi (Himalayas) and lived in the Himalayas for 2–3 years like a traditional monk, wandering without any fixed residence, practicing Tapasya (Spiritual Austerities) and living by Bhiksha (Begging food). After return he went to Dhaka Center (of Ramakrishna Order) till 1932.

In 1936, he was appointed the president of the Ramakrishna Math, Shillong. In 1945, he was appointed as the president of Rajkot Math. There he translated Ramakrishna-Vivekananda-Vedanta literature into Gujarati, and served in the relief operations relief operations organized by the Order in the flooded areas of West Bengal in 1926, as the Camp-in-charge of the Burma Evacuee Relief in 1942 and many others. In 1965, Bhuteshanandaji was appointed as one of the Trustees and a Member of the Governing body of Ramakrishna Mission. In 1975, Bhuteshanandaji became one of the vice-presidents of the Order and moved over to Kankurgachi Yogodyan, a suburb of Kolkata. Following the death of Gambhirananda (27 December 1988), the 11th president of the Order, in 1989 (24 January), he became the 12th president. From 1975 to 1998, he initiated many. he never wrote any books, but his explanation and classes on spiritual texts like the Upanishads, Sri Sri Ramakrishna Kathamrita (English: The Gospel of Sri Ramakrishna), Bhagavatam, etc. have been recorded by others who were present there. Some books have been published from his lectures and class talks, of which Sri Ramakrishna Kathamrita Prasanga (in six vols.), Mundakopanishad, Kathopanishad, Upanishad O Ajker Manush, Sharanagati (all in Bengali) and Thoughts on Spiritual Life (in English).

During twenty-three years as vice president and President of the Order he travelled to many countries including Singapore, Fiji, Japan, Australia, America, Canada, England, France, Bangladesh and Sri Lanka, and carried the ideals and ideas of Ramakrishna-Mother-Vivekananda to innumerable people. He had a special fascination for Vedānta- Advaita Vedānta. 

He died on 10 August 1998.
On 18 December 2015, a new temple and monastery were inaugurated at Somsar, his ancestral village in Bankura district.

References

External links
  at https://vedantastl.org/

Presidents of the Ramakrishna Order
Monks of the Ramakrishna Mission
1901 births
1998 deaths